Juan Olivella was a Spanish footballer who played as a forward. The dates of his birth and death are unknown.

Club career
Born in Catalonia, he began playing football at FC Internacional in 1917, before joining CE Europa in 1920. As a member of this club, Olivella won the Catalan Championship in 1923 after beating Barcelona 1-0 in a play-off title-decider, and started in the 1923 Copa del Rey Final, where they were beaten 0-1 by Athletic Bilbao, courtesy of a goal from Travieso. He joined FC Barcelona in the 1926-27 season, but in March 1927 he moved to UE Sants, where he ended his career in the 1927-28 season.

International career
He represented the Catalonia national team several times, being part of the team that won the 1923–24 Prince of Asturias Cup. Olivella scored the opening goal in the quarter-finals against Gipuzkoa on 25 November 1923, in an eventual 2-1 win, although some sources state that he was the author of both goals.

Honours

Club
CE Europa
Catalan football championship:
Champions (1): 1922-23

Copa del Rey:
Runner-up (1): 1923

International
Catalonia
Prince of Asturias Cup:
Champions (1): 1923–24

References

Year of birth missing
Year of death missing
Footballers from Catalonia
Spanish footballers
Association football forwards
CE Europa footballers
FC Barcelona players
UE Sants players
Catalonia international footballers